Bones of Crows is a Canadian drama film, directed by Marie Clements and released in 2022. The film stars Grace Dove as Aline Spears, a Cree woman who survives the Indian residential school system to become a code talker for the Canadian Air Force during World War II.

The film's cast also includes Phillip Lewitski, Rémy Girard, Karine Vanasse, Michelle Thrush, Glen Gould, Gail Maurice, Cara Gee, Joshua Odjick and Jonathan Whitesell, as well as Alanis Obomsawin in a small supporting role.

The film premiered at the 2022 Toronto International Film Festival on September 10, 2022.

It will be followed in 2023 by a five-hour CBC Television limited series, which delves more deeply into Spears's extended family history over 100 years.

Awards
The film received five Canadian Screen Award nominations at the 11th Canadian Screen Awards in 2023, for Best Original Screenplay (Clements), Best Original Song (Clements, Wayne Lavallee and Jesse Zubot for "You Are My Bones"), Best Makeup (Darci Jackson and Elizabeth McLeod), Best Hair (Charlene Dunn) and Best Visual Effects (Eric Gambini, Sarah Krusch Flanagan, Louis Mackall, Virginie Strub, Andrew Joe, Gabriel Chiang and Linus Burghardt).

References

External links

2022 films
2022 drama films
2020s Canadian drama television series
Canadian drama films
Canadian television miniseries
CBC Television original programming
Films directed by Marie Clements
First Nations television series
2020s English-language films
2023 Canadian television series debuts
English-language Canadian films
Cree-language films
Italian-language Canadian films
2020s Canadian films